In economics, the Metzler paradox (named after the American economist Lloyd Metzler) is the theoretical possibility that the imposition of a tariff on imports may reduce the relative internal price of that good.  It was proposed by Lloyd Metzler in 1949 upon examination of tariffs within the Heckscher–Ohlin model.  The paradox has roughly the same status as immiserizing growth and a transfer that makes the recipient worse off.

The strange result could occur if the exporting country's offer curve is very inelastic.  In this case, the tariff lowers the duty-free cost of the price of the import by such a great degree that the effect of the improvement of the tariff-imposing countries' terms of trade on relative prices exceeds the amount of the tariff.  Such a tariff would not protect the industry competing with the imported goods.

It is deemed to be unlikely in practice.

See also
Leontief paradox
Lerner paradox
List of paradoxes
Rybczynski effect

References

Further reading
 

International trade theory
Paradoxes in economics